A  in the Eastern Orthodox Church is a decree of the head of a particular Eastern Orthodox church on certain matters (such as the level of dependence of an autonomous church from its mother church).

 is a Greek word; it can be literally translated as 'a section'. "In the narrower meaning in Orthodox church terminology, a tomos is [...] a scroll or a small book, but one with a very specific purpose — it codifies a decision by a Holy Synod, or council of Orthodox bishops." The translation of the word  in English is document.

See also
 
 Tomos dated 29 June 1850
 Canon law of the Eastern Orthodox Church

References

External links 
 

Documents
Canon law of the Eastern Orthodox Church